Bam Anguri (also Romanized as Bām Āngūrī; also known as Bāmāngūr) is a village in Mishan Rural District, Mahvarmilani District, Mamasani County, Fars Province, Iran. At the 2006 census, its population was 20, in 5 families.

References 

Populated places in Mamasani County